R. Malcolm Jones is an American music video and motion picture director. Jones is a graduate of the University of Miami. While a student at the university, Jones was granted the Eastman Kodak Scholarship. He is its youngest recipient. Jones also received a Merit Scholarship.

After graduation R. Malcolm Jones went on to direct Music Videos for various artist. He was nominated for Video Director of the Year at the BET Awards. TheMTV Video Awards nominated his video Right Round by Flo Rida feat Kei$ha for Best Hip Hop Video.

R. Malcolm Jones has directed Music Videos for Flo Rida, Avril Lavigne, Cassidy feat Swizz Beats, T-Pain, Chris Brown, Lil Mama, Mario, Ray J, Cali Swag District, K’la, YC, Travis Porter, Jordan Taylor, Vanessa Hudgens, Nas, Clipse, Fat Joe, Brooke Hogan, The Pack, and Roscoe Dash.  Jones has also directed commercials for HBO (a talk with Spike Lee), BET (BET Spring Bling) and CMT (Dallas Cowboy Cheerleaders). He made a personal appearance as a guest on BET's Top 25 Countdown and was a featured director for VH1's Hogan Knows Best, MTV's Making The Video, and BET's All Access Granted.

Projects Jones has written and directed include Seven Lives: Seven Survivors (a documentary and short films include, Ambush, Sweet Potato Pie and Shattered. His first major film, Secrets of the Magic City - starring Jenifer Lewis, Jamie Hector and Keith David - screened at the American Black Film Festival (ABFF) in the "Narrative" category, and at the Annual Urban World Film Festival in New York City, and the Bronze Lens Film Festival in Atlanta, where Jamie Hector and Jenifer Lewis were nominated and won awards for Best Actor and Actress. It won at the CAPRI Capital Partners Award at the 22nd Annual Pan African Film Festival, and had an international premiere in Paris at the Champs-Élysées Film Festival. The film debuted on Centric TV and received worldwide distribution with EOne Entertainment.

Education
University of Miami, Bachelor of Science in Communications, Miami, Florida,
Double Major Film and English (Creative Writing)
Kermit & Mickey Schafer Scholarship winner for outstanding academics

George Washington University

Awards
BET Awards, Video Director of the Year Nominee
MTV Video Music Awards, Best Hip Hop Video - Nominee

Music videos

"GDFR" Flo Rida feat. Sage Gemini		
"Brown Sugar" Ray J feat Lil Wayne		
"Accessory" – Jordyn Taylor		
"Right Round" - Flo Rida	
"Shawty Get Loose" - Lil' Mama featuring Chris Brown & T-Pain				
"Sneakernight" - Vanessa Hudgens	
"Cryin' Out For Me" – Mario		
"Drink N My 2 Step" - Cassidy featuring Swizz Beats		
"Hair Braider" - R. Kelly
"Lip Gloss" - Lil' Mama
"G-Slide" - Lil’ Mama
"Girlfriend" - Avril Lavigne featuring Lil’ Mama
"Sexy Can I" - Ray J featuring Yung Berg
"Make It Rain" - Fat Joe featuring R. Kelly, T.I., Lil Wayne, Birdman, Rick Ross and Ace Mac
"Hustlers" - Nas featuring The Game
"L.I.F.E." - Lil’ Mama
"Mr. Me Too" – Clipse
"So Much More" - Fat Joe
"What It Is" - Lil’ Mama featuring T-Pain
"About Us" - Brooke Hogan featuring Paul Wall
"Vans" - The Pack
"Wamp Wamp" – Clipse
"Come Get It" - Yummy Bingham featuring Jadakiss
“All Your Love” -K’la		
”Racks"- YC feat. Future”
“College Girl”- Travis Porter	
"Show Out”-Roscoe Dash	
“Burn Out”- Cali Swag District

References
http://directorrmalcolmjones.com/
http://www.essence.com/2013/09/27/coffee-talk-video-jenifer-lewis-talks-about-her-new-film-magic-city/
http://blogs.indiewire.com/shadowandact/uwff-2013-review-magic-city-a-poignant-coming-of-age-tale-where-girls-take-center-stage
Reuters
http://www.huffingtonpost.com/myrdith-leon-mccormack/the-magic-of-film-abff-an_b_3814328.html
/news/big_possibilities_lil_wayne_bet_hip-hop/29276
https://web.archive.org/web/20120518065417/http://www.videostatic.com/vs/island_def_jam/page/2/
http://365voice.com/pre-grammy-private-mixer-for-the-magic-city-film-photos/r-malcolm-jones-cedric-the-entertainermagic-city006-m/
https://web.archive.org/web/20120406012906/http://www.floridaentertainmentsummit.com/
http://www.sfltimes.com/index.php?option=com_content&task=view&id=5215&Itemid=144
http://buzzworthy.mtv.com/2009/08/04/vmas-2009-the-nominations-have-been-announced-lady-gaga-beyonce-9-nominations-trump-britneys-7/
http://www.songfacts.com/detail.php?id=10576
http://www.last.fm/event/969792+GORILLA+ZOE+VIDEO+SHOOT
http://ilpvideo.com/video.php?v=Mjc0Njg
http://www.amentertainment.com/artists/ray-j
http://www.imdb.com/title/tt2079597/
http://vimeo.com/11320711
http://avril-l.org/videography.html
http://www.remixes.net/loosespirit.html
http://rap.about.com/od/awards/a/HipHopAwards08.htm
http://ilpvideo.com/video.php?v=MTg0Mzg
http://365voice.com/stars-come-out-for-screening-of-r-malcolm-jones-film-the-magic-city-flo-rida-udonis-haslem-pictures/the-magic-city-flo-rida-desloc-piccalo-r-malcolm-jones/
http://musicremedy.com/d/dj-khaled/songs/holla-at-me-ft-lil-wayne-fat-joe-paul-wall-rick-ross-pitbull-5666.html
http://www.emusic.com/artist/ray-j/11651696/
http://www.vh1.com/artists/az/hogan_brooke/artist.jhtml
 What It Is (Strike a Pose)
https://web.archive.org/web/20120518065417/http://www.videostatic.com/vs/island_def_jam/page/2/
http://www.theboombox.com/2011/04/21/rapper-yc-debuts-racks-video/
http://www.blackcollegereunion.com/category/spring-bling/bet/
https://web.archive.org/web/20120604072236/http://creativity-online.com/news/the-production-alist-09-radicalmedia/139868
http://www.blogtalkradio.com/traceymoore.rss
https://web.archive.org/web/20110825090619/http://ti.rapbasement.com/discography.php
https://web.archive.org/web/20100102082105/http://concreteloop.com/2008/01/video-sets-lil-mama-chris-brown-t-pain
http://popculturemadness.blogspot.com/2008/09/lil-wayne-leads-roster-of-hip-hop-all.htm

American music video directors
Living people
Year of birth missing (living people)